Manly Council was a local government area on the northern beaches region of Sydney, New South Wales, Australia, first incorporated in 1877.
On 12 May 2016, the Minister for Local Government announced that Manly Council would be subsumed into the newly formed Northern Beaches Council. The last mayor of Manly Council was Cr. Jean Hay , a member of the Liberal Party.

Suburbs in the local government area
 Balgowlah
 Balgowlah Heights
 Clontarf
 Fairlight
 Manly
 Seaforth

History
 Manly was first incorporated on 6 January 1877 as the Municipal District of Manly, and met for the first time on 15 February 1877, when the first mayor was elected, Thomas Rowe. The council first met in temporary premises including the original Ivanhoe Hotel in Ivanhoe Park, until 1909, and from then on Llangollen, the former mansion of William Howard Rolfe at the end of the Corso, served as the new council chambers. There were no wards until October 1890 when the council petitioned to be divided into three wards, which was proclaimed in December 1890: The Steyne Ward to the north, Fairlight Ward to the southeast and Wentworth Ward to the east.

Manly was the only local government authority on the Northern Beaches until the proclamation of Warringah Shire in 1906, with the Burnt Bridge Creek forming the northern boundary with Warringah. From 1906 the council became the Municipality of Manly. In August 1909, the council petitioned for the abolition of wards in favour of one at-large electorate, which was subsequently proclaimed. In 1918, seven of the council's alderman who had accepted free ferry passes from the Port Jackson and Manly Steamship Company were charged and found guilty by a magistrate of contravening the Local Government Act and disqualified to act as aldermen. As the council only had a total of nine alderman, there was a period when the council did not have quorum and therefore did not function. The convictions were overturned on appeal.

In April 1927, Alderman Alfred Reid passed through a motion to petition the NSW Government for upgrading Manly to City status. This petition was rejected by Minister for Local Government Eric Spooner in May 1938, citing that Manly did not fulfill the requirements of such a status. In response, Mayor Aubrey Hanson-Norman upheld Manly's arguments for such a petition: "We have a population of about 10,000 and the revenue including the electricity undertaking is £180,000 [...] Geographically too, Manly is more or less separated from other parts of the metropolitan area." After a long and protracted debate over the construction of a purpose-built town hall, in February 1937 the old Town Hall had been demolished and a Neo-Georgian revival Town Hall by Samuel Reginald Maisey of the prominent local firm Trenchard Smith & Maisey, which served as the seat of the council until 2016.

From 1951 to 1980, the Mackellar County Council operated on the Northern Beaches as an electricity and gas supplier and retailer as a joint operation of Manly Municipal Council and Warringah Shire Council. The council became known as Manly Council on 1 July 1993 following the enactment of the Local Government Act, 1993 which also stipulated that the term 'Town Clerk' be replaced with 'General Manager' and 'Alderman' be replaced by 'Councillor'.

2016 amalgamation proposal
A 2015 review of local government boundaries by the NSW Government Independent Pricing and Regulatory Tribunal recommended that the Manly Council merge with adjoining councils. The government considered two proposals.

The alternative, proposed by Warringah Council on 23 February 2016, was for an amalgamation of the Pittwater, Manly and Warringah councils, which was proclaimed as the Northern Beaches Council on 12 May 2016.

Demographics
At the 2011 Census, there were  people in the Manly local government area, of these 48.8% were male and 51.2% were female. Aboriginal and Torres Strait Islander people made up 0.3% of the population. The median age of people in the Manly Council area was 37 years. Children aged 0 – 14 years made up 18.9% of the population and people aged 65 years and over made up 13.5% of the population. Of people in the area aged 15 years and over, 48.5% were married and 10.3% were either divorced or separated.

Population growth in the Manly Council area between the 2001 Census and the 2006 Census was 1.55% and in the subsequent five years to the 2011 Census, population growth was 7.11%. When compared with total population growth of Australia for the same periods, being 5.78% and 8.32% respectively, population growth in the Manly local government area was lower than the national average. The median weekly income for residents within the Manly Council area was significantly higher than the national average.

Council

Final composition and election method
Manly Council was composed of nine Councillors, including the mayor, for a fixed four-year term of office. The mayor was directly elected from 1995 to 2016 while the eight other councillors were elected proportionally as one ward. The last election was held on 8 September 2012, and the final makeup of the council, including the mayor, was as follows:

Council seal
Manly was the first council on the northern beaches, being incorporated in 1877, but it is not known when it adopted the council seal. The image of two indigenous men standing by the shore watching the approach of the first Europeans to visit Manly in 1788, has been modified several times over the decades, with the earliest found version dating from 1905. This image is a direct reference to the naming of "Manly" by the first Governor of New South Wales, Arthur Phillip, who visited on 21 January 1788, who noted that the "[Manly aboriginals'] confidence and manly behaviour induced me to give the name Manly Cove to this place".

In 1952 the new Mackellar County Council commissioned the President of the Manly and Warringah District Historical Society, Percy Walter Gledhill, to design a council seal and Gledhill's design included this image.

A later Manly council seal from 1913 omitted the approaching Europeans, but they returned in the last version, which was designed by Susan Hammond and introduced in 1990.

Sister cities
Manly had sister city relationships with a number of cities around the world:
 Taito, Tokyo, Japan
 Jing'an, China
 Bath, England, United Kingdom
 Oecusse, East Timor
 Huntington Beach, California, United States of America

Manly also had three friendship cities:
 Odawara, Kanagawa, Japan
 Yeongdo-gu, Busan, South Korea
  Gunnedah, New South Wales

References

External links
Manly Council (Archived)

Manly
Manly, New South Wales
1877 establishments in Australia
2016 disestablishments in Australia
Northern Beaches